Guilford County Courthouse is a historic courthouse building located at Greensboro, Guilford County, North Carolina. It was designed by architect Harry Barton and built between 1918 and 1920.  It is a five-story, rectangular Renaissance Revival building. It has a rusticated raised basement, fluted Ionic pilasters on the upper three stories, a stone balustrade, and a shallow pedimented hexastyle portico.  It served as the courthouse until 1974 when it became part of the county complex which combines the old and new courthouses as the center of county government.

It was listed on the National Register of Historic Places in 1979.

References

County courthouses in North Carolina
Courthouses on the National Register of Historic Places in North Carolina
Renaissance Revival architecture in North Carolina
Government buildings completed in 1920
Buildings and structures in Greensboro, North Carolina
National Register of Historic Places in Guilford County, North Carolina